Gabriela Alexandra Fernández Ocanto, is a pageant titleholder from Maracaibo, Zulia state, Venezuela who competed in the Miss Venezuela 2008 pageant on September 10, 2008.

Fernández won the Miss Zulia 2008 title in a state pageant held in Maracaibo, Venezuela on 7 May 2008.

References

External links
Miss Venezuela Official Website
Miss Venezuela La Nueva Era MB

1986 births
Living people
Venezuelan female models
People from Maracaibo